Reg Davies (24 November 1909 – 10 April 1987) was an  Australian rules footballer who played with Hawthorn in the Victorian Football League (VFL).

Notes

External links 

1909 births
1987 deaths
VFL/AFL players born outside Australia
Australian rules footballers from Victoria (Australia)
Hawthorn Football Club players